Pope Matthew (Matthias) the Second was the 90th Pope of Alexandria and Patriarch of the See of St. Mark.  He became a monk in El-Muharraq Monastery and later was Coptic Pope for thirteen years. He is commemorated in the Calendar of Saints of the Coptic Church on the 13th day of Thout.

References

Coptic Orthodox saints
15th-century Coptic Orthodox popes of Alexandria
1465 deaths